Wetlugasaurus (meaning "Vetluga River lizard") 
is an extinct genus of temnospondyl amphibian from the Early Triassic (Olenekian) Charkabozh, Kzylsaiskaya, Petropavlovka, Kamennyi Yar and Vetluga Series Formations of northern Russia and Greenland.

References

Further reading 
 The Age of Dinosaurs in Russia and Mongolia by Michael J. Benton, Mikhail A. Shishkin, David M. Unwin, and Evgenii N. Kurochkin. p. 35-59.
 Bibliography Of Fossil Vertebrates 1934-1938 by C. I. Camp

Capitosaurs
Prehistoric amphibian genera
Triassic temnospondyls of Europe
Olenekian life
Fossils of Russia
Fossil taxa described in 1930